Gary Greenberg is an American author and comedian. He is known for writing comedic material for Comedy Central. He has appeared on Comedy Central and Bravo. , he is a staff writer on Jimmy Kimmel Live! on ABC Television. In 2012, he won a Producers and Writers Guild Award for his work as head writer of Jimmy Kimmel's After the Academy Awards telecast.

Published works 
Greenberg is the author of The Pop-up Book of Phobias, The Pop-up Book of Nightmares, Self-Helpless: The Greatest Self-Help Books You'll Never Read, and Be Prepared: A Practical Handbook For New Dads. Be Prepared has received positive reviews from Publishers Weekly, Parenting, Men's Health, and Esquire.

 Greenberg, Gary; and Matthew Reinhart (1999). The Pop-up Book of Phobias, It Books, 22 pages. 
 Greenberg, Gary; and Jonathan Bines (1999). Self-Helpless: The Greatest Self-Help Books You'll Never Read, Career Press, 160 pages 
 Greenberg, Gary; Balvis Rubess; and Matthew Reinhart (2001). The Pop-up Book of Nightmares, St. Martin's Press, 22 pages. 
 Greenberg, Gary; and Jeannie Hayden (2004). Be Prepared: A Practical Handbook For New Dads, Simon & Schuster, 240 pages.

References

External links 
 

Living people
Year of birth missing (living people)
21st-century American comedians
American male comedians
American male writers
Harper's Magazine people